

The Griffon Lionheart is an American single-engined, six-seat biplane designed and produced in kit form for home building by Griffon Aerospace of Harvest, Alabama.

Design and development
The Lionheart is based on the Beechcraft Staggerwing biplane of the 1930s; but unlike the steel tube, wood and fabric construction of the Staggerwing it has a composite structure.  The Staggerwing has strut-braced wings but the Lionheart has cantilever wings with a total area about 20% less than the wings of the Staggerwing. It is powered by a 450 hp (336 kW) Pratt & Whitney R-985 Wasp Junior radial engine with a three-bladed propeller. It has a retractable conventional landing gear with a tailwheel. The enclosed cabin is slightly longer than the Staggerwing's cabin to allow room for the pilot and five passengers, and it has a split airstair access door on the port side.

The Lionheart first flew on 27 July 1997 and was first displayed in public at EAA AirVenture Oshkosh a few days later. Five kits were sold by April 1998, and two of the kits were completed by 2001, with another almost complete. As of August 2011, three Lionhearts are registered in the United States, with another example on display in an aviation museum at Tullahoma Regional Airport in Tullahoma, Tennessee. Kits are no longer being produced.

Specifications

References

Notes

Bibliography

External links

 Griffon Aerospace
 Lionheart N110N

1990s United States civil utility aircraft
Homebuilt aircraft
Biplanes with negative stagger
Single-engined tractor aircraft
Aircraft first flown in 1997